Aralık can refer to:

 Aralık
 Aralık, Bismil
 Aralık, Borçka
 Aralık, Mustafakemalpaşa